Tim Pawsat (born December 10, 1963, in Long Beach, California) is a former professional tennis player from the United States.

During his career, he won five doubles titles and finished runner-up an additional three times. He achieved a career-high doubles ranking of World No. 21 in 1990.

Career finals

Doubles (5 wins, 3 losses)

External links
 
 

American male tennis players
Tennis players from Long Beach, California
USC Trojans men's tennis players
Universiade medalists in tennis
Living people
1963 births
Universiade silver medalists for the United States
Medalists at the 1985 Summer Universiade